George Dumbrell (23 September 1906 – 1990) was an English professional football full back and centre forward who appeared in the Football League for Leicester City, Brentford and Bournemouth & Boscombe Athletic.

Career statistics

References

1906 births
English footballers
English Football League players
Brentford F.C. players
Footballers from Catford
Association football fullbacks
Association football forwards
Leicester City F.C. players
AFC Bournemouth players
1990 deaths
Hayes F.C. players
Nunhead F.C. players
Cray Wanderers F.C. players
Dartford F.C. players